Kheal Das Kohistani (کھیل داس کوہستانی) is a Pakistani politician who has been a member of the National Assembly of Pakistan since August 2018.

Political career

He was elected to the National Assembly of Pakistan as a candidate of Pakistan Muslim League (N) on a reserved seat for minorities in 2018 Pakistani general election.

References

Living people
Pakistan Muslim League (N) MNAs
Pakistani MNAs 2018–2023
Pakistani Hindus
Year of birth missing (living people)